Jacob Freudenthal (20 June 1839 – 1 June 1907) was a German philosopher. He was born at Bodenfelde, Hanover and died at Schreiberhau.

Freudenthal received his education at the universities of Breslau and Göttingen, and at the rabbinical seminary of Breslau. In 1875, he became lecturer in philosophy at the University of Breslau; in 1878 he was elected assistant professor, in 1888 professor, of philosophy. He was a member of the senate of the university in 1894–96, and dean of the philosophical faculty in 1898–99. The Prussian Academy of Science sent him to England in 1888 to study English philosophy, and in 1898 to the Netherlands to research the life of Spinoza.

The results of these voyages were his "Beiträge zur Englischen Philosophie", in the "Archiv für Geschichte der Philosophie" (iv. 450 et seq., v. 1 et seq.), and "Die Lebensgeschichte Spinoza's", Leipzig, 1899.

He contributed various essays to the publications of the Prussian Academy of Science, such as:

 to the "Rheinische Museum",
 to the "Archiv für Geschichte der Philosophie",
 to "Hermes",
 to the "J. Q. R.",
 to Monatsschrift Allg. Zeit. des Judenthums"

He also published:

 "Ueber den Begriff der Φαντασία bei Aristoteles" (1863);
 "Die Flavius Josephus Beigelegte Schrift über die Herrschaft der Vernunft", 1869;
 "Hellenistische Studien" (1875–79);
 "Ueber die Theologie des Xenophanes" (1886)

References

19th-century German philosophers
Jewish philosophers
19th-century German Jews
1839 births
1907 deaths
19th-century German male writers
Spinoza scholars